The following is a list of artwork by Hans Fredrik Gude, a Norwegian romantic painter.

Table of Paintings

Notes

References

Lists of paintings